Souljaboytellem.com is the first studio album and major label debut by American rapper and producer Soulja Boy Tell 'Em. It was released on October 2, 2007, by his Stacks on Deck (SOD) label, Collipark Music and Interscope Records. The album only features guest appearances from fellow rapper Arab and R&B group i15. The album was supported by four singles: "Crank That (Soulja Boy)", "Soulja Girl" featuring i15, "Yahhh!" featuring Arab, and "Donk".

Souljaboytellem.com debuted at number 4 on the US Billboard 200, selling 117,000 copies in the first week. The album received generally poor reviews from music critics.

Singles
The album's lead single, called "Crank That (Soulja Boy)" was released on May 2, 2007. The song topped the US Billboard Hot 100 and then stayed for over 7 weeks; and topped the US Hot Rap Songs, staying there for over five weeks. The song also reached on the top five in Australia, Canada, Ireland, New Zealand and the United Kingdom.

The album's second single, called "Soulja Girl" featuring i15, was released on October 1, 2007. The song peaked at numbers 32, 13 and 6 on the US Billboard Hot 100, Hot R&B/Hip-Hop Songs and Hot Rap Songs charts, respectively. It was able to peak at number 10 in New Zealand.

The album's third single, "Yahhh!" featuring Arab, was released on December 31, 2007. The song peaked at numbers 48, 34 and 14 on the US Billboard Hot 100, Hot R&B/Hip-Hop Songs and Hot Rap Songs charts, respectively. It also reached the top 40 in Australia, Ireland and New Zealand.

The album's fourth and final single, "Donk" was released on May 4, 2008. The single was fared less successful by peaking at numbers 37 and 22 on the Hot R&B/Hip-Hop Songs and Hot Rap Songs charts, respectively.

Critical reception 

Souljaboytellem.com received mostly negative reviews from music critics. In a negative review, PopMatters said that the album "fails because it’s barely memorable, lacking any kind of successor to 'Crank That' to keep Soulja Boy relevant". In a positive review, AllMusic's David Jeffries said that the album "should satisfy giggling Right On! readers with pin-ups in their locker, way too cool mash-up fans that carry gigabytes of club music in their pocket, and all the freaky party people in between". More negative reviews came from Simon Vozick-Levinson of Entertainment Weekly who called the album a "teenage wasteland filled with monotonously looped chants and agonizing blunt-force beats." Fellow EW writer Chris Willman ranked the album number 1 on his list of the worst albums of 2007, stating that, "If you're seeking a circle of hell lower than the one in which "Crank That" is ubiquitous, listen to his entire album." Steve Juon of RapReviews gave the album a 3 out of 10, finding the beats and melodies to be "monotonous", concluding with "The only hoe that got Superman'd on 'SouljaBoyTellEm.com' is anybody who spent $14.99 on this album." Tyler of Sputnikmusic said "To try and explain just how bad the "music" is on this disc is about as much of a masochistic exercise as listening to it. The beats are a mish-mash of shitty keyboard loops and samples from "Crank That". The lyrics, if you can call them that, are rarely no more than the song titles repeated at different tempos".

Commercial performance 
Souljaboytellem.com debuted at number 4 on the US Billboard 200, selling 117,000 copies in the first week. Souljaboytellem.com has sold 1,322,000 copies in the United States, according to Nielsen Soundscan.

Track listing 

Sample credits
 "Report Card" – contains samples of "Throw Some D's" performed by Rich Boy.

Personnel 
Adapted from the Souljaboytellem.com liner notes.

 John Frye: mixing (Stankonia Studios; Atlanta, GA)
 Gary Fry: assistant engineering
 Dave Grohl: Drums
 Dave "Hard Drive" Pensado: mixing ("Soulja Girl"; Larabee North Studios)
 Michael "Mr. ColliPark" Crooms: executive producer
 Christen Gallope: creative
 Cliff Feiman: production manager
 SLANG Inc.: art direction
 Dave Hill: photography
 Mark Star: Soulja Boy Tellem logo design

Charts

Weekly charts

Year-end charts

Release history

See also
 List of number-one rap albums of 2007 (U.S.)

References

External links
 Official website
 

2007 debut albums
Soulja Boy albums
Interscope Records albums
Albums produced by Mr. Collipark
Snap albums